T